Emma Ribom (born 29 November 1997) is a Swedish cross-country skier. She won Ungdomsvasan in February 2013.

Cross-country skiing results
All results are sourced from the International Ski Federation (FIS).

Olympic Games

World Championships
 3 medals – (1 gold, 1 silver, 1 bronze)

World Cup

Season standings

Individual podiums
 2 victories – (2 ) 
 6 podiums – (5 , 1 )

Team podiums
 5 podiums – (4 , 1 )

References

External links

Swedish female cross-country skiers
Place of birth missing (living people)
1997 births
Living people
Olympic cross-country skiers of Sweden
Cross-country skiers at the 2022 Winter Olympics
21st-century Swedish women
FIS Nordic World Ski Championships medalists in cross-country skiing